Robert Lee "Bobby" Howard (November 24, 1944 – April 7, 2008) was an American football defensive back. He played in the American Football League (AFL) for the San Diego Chargers, where he was a second-round selection in the 1967 Common Draft.  He also played for the  Chargers, Philadelphia Eagles, and New England Patriots in the National Football League (NFL).

College career
Howard first played college football at Cal Poly San Luis Obispo, where he later transferred to San Diego State University, where he had been recruited by Don Coryell.

Personal
Howard married Barbara Howard after graduating from San Bernardino High School.  They had three children, two girls and a boy.
Bob Howard died of cancer on April 7, 2008.

See also
 List of American Football League players

References

1944 births
2008 deaths
American football cornerbacks
Cal Poly Mustangs football players
New England Patriots players
Philadelphia Eagles players
San Diego Chargers players
San Diego State Aztecs football players
People from Tallulah, Louisiana
Sportspeople from San Bernardino, California
Players of American football from California
Deaths from prostate cancer
Deaths from cancer in California
American Football League players